Michaël Jeremiasz and Gordon Reid were the defending champions but withdrew in the round robin.

Stéphane Houdet and Nicolas Peifer defeated Gustavo Fernández and Joachim Gérard in the final, 2–6, 6–3, 7–5 to win the title.

Seeds

  Stéphane Houdet /  Nicolas Peifer (champions)
  Michaël Jeremiasz /  Gordon Reid (round robin, withdrew)
  Gustavo Fernández /  Joachim Gérard (final)
  Alfie Hewett /  David Phillipson (semifinals, third place)
  Rafael Medeiros /  Daniel Rodrigues (round robin)
  Maurício Pommê /  Carlos Santos (semifinals, fourth place)
  Antonio Cippo /  Ivan Tratter (round robin)
  Massimiliano Banci /  Silviu Culea (round robin)

Draw

Finals

Group A

Group B

References

External links

Men's doubles draw

Masters, 2016